Neerchal is an area in Kannur City, Kannur District of Kerala state, south India.

Suburbs of Kannur